Donald Cumming (born 1981) is an American actor, musician, singer and songwriter. He is best known as the lead singer of the New York City band The Virgins. After two albums, the band announced their split in 2013.

Cumming's first solo album Out Calls Only was released on June 16, 2015. His solo career has been acclaimed by Rolling Stone, The Wall Street Journal, NME, The Guardian, Rolling Stone Germany, Paste and Entertainment Weekly.

Musical career

The Virgins 
The Virgins were a rock band formed in New York City by Donald from 2006 to 2013. They signed to Atlantic Records to release their first full-length, self-titled album The Virgins. The song “Rich Girls” was on Rolling Stone’s list of 100 Best Songs of 2008. In 2012, the band returned, signing with Julian Casablancas’, of The Strokes, label Cult Records. In March 2013, they released their album Strike Gently.

The Virgins made multiple national and international tours, opened for The Killers, Iggy Pop and The Stooges, Lou Reed, Sonic Youth, Patti Smith, Kenneth Anger, and more. They have also made television appearances on the Late Show with David Letterman, Late Night with Conan O’Brien, Late Night with Jimmy Fallon, and Last Call with Carson Daly.

Solo career 
His first major performance as a solo artist was at the 2014 Bonnaroo Music Festival.

Cumming was later featured in Richard Hell's artist series "Night Out with Richard Hell. The event was held at the New York City Symphony Space, and was a two hour conversation between Hell and Cumming that touched upon; music, art, and film."

Cumming released his debut solo album Out Calls Only on June 16, 2015 with the single, "Game of the Heart" on Washington Square Music.  British newspaper The Guardian described it as a carefully constructed period piece, and rated it three stars. NME listed it under 8 Great Albums That May Have Passed You By This Week and was rated eight stars by the music magazine. Since his album release, Donald has opened for both Brandon Flowers and The Killers.

Acting career 
In 2006, Cumming starred in the short film "Bug Crush". The film went on to win the Short Filmmaking Award at the Sundance Film Festival.

References

External links
Donald Cumming's official Facebook page

American male singer-songwriters
1981 births
Living people
Singers from New York City
Date of birth missing (living people)
21st-century American singers
21st-century American male singers
Singer-songwriters from New York (state)